Jean-Michel Baylet (born 17 November 1946 in Toulouse, Haute-Garonne) is a French politician, Senator, and former leader of the moderate center-left Radical Party of the Left.

He is a RDSE Senator from the Tarn-et-Garonne department. He is also President of the General Council of the Tarn-et-Garonne. He also served as mayor Valence-d'Agen until 2001 and had various roles in the governments of Laurent Fabius, Michel Rocard, Édith Cresson, and Pierre Beregovoy.

In addition to his political career, he was a journalist for the La Dépêche du Midi newspaper, before inheriting that newspaper and other print media from his mother.

Baylet was candidate to the citizens presidential primary of 2011; he lost against Martine Aubry, François Hollande, Ségolène Royal, Arnaud Montebourg and Manuel Valls (all socialists).

References 

1946 births
Living people
Politicians from Toulouse
Radical Party of the Left politicians
Government ministers of France
French Senators of the Fifth Republic
Mayors of places in Occitania (administrative region)
Senators of Tarn-et-Garonne